Luke Young is an Australian former professional rugby league footballer who  last played for Welsh side Crusaders in National League Two. Previously with Canterbury Bulldogs, Young made 30 appearances in his last season for the Crusaders scoring 14 tries and 14 goals.

References

External links
Canterbury Bulldogs profile

1980 births
Living people
Australian rugby league players
Canterbury-Bankstown Bulldogs players
Crusaders Rugby League players
Rugby league five-eighths
Rugby league fullbacks
Penrith Panthers players
Place of birth missing (living people)